Beijerinckia derxii is a nitrogen fixing bacteria from the genus of Beijerinckia.

References

External links
Type strain of Beijerinckia derxii at BacDive -  the Bacterial Diversity Metadatabase

Beijerinckiaceae
Bacteria described in 1957
Martinus Beijerinck